Benjamin Wani Yugusuk (1928, in Thobole, Juba – 23 May 2000, in Kosti) was a Sudanese Anglican (Episcopalian) bishop. He was the second archbishop and primate of the Episcopal Church of Sudan, from 1988 to 1998.

Early life
He was born to parents of the Lulubo ethnic group, who practised the worship of ancestors. He studied at Lomega Elementary School, from 1939 to 1944. He was baptized in the Anglican church on 25 December 1941. He moved afterwards to Juba Teacher Primary School. He entered Yei Teacher Training Institute in 1946, where he earned a certificate in teaching in 1947. He was a teacher at Juba Elementary School, from 1948 to 1950.

Ecclesiastical career
He decided to study Theology at Gwynne College in Mundri, where he graduated in 1952. He was ordained as a deacon on 17 January 1953, and as a priest on 5 May 1955. He was the priest at the Lomega and Lainya parishes in 1956. He was also secretary to the Diocese of the Sudan, in Khartum, in 1960. He moved to England, where he studied at the London College of Divinity, earning a diploma as M.D. in 1969.

He was consecrated bishop in Khartoum, on 24 January 1971, during the Episcopal Synod of the Middle East, by the Archbishop of Canterbury, Michael Ramsey. He was transferred as acting bishop to the Diocese of Yei in 1975. The Province of the Episcopal Church of Sudan was created on 11 September 1976; he then became bishop of the Episcopal Diocese of Rumbek, the largest in the province, where he would serve until 1988.

He became dean of the province in Juba, in 1986, and served as acting archbishop of the Episcopal Church of Sudan, from 1986 to 1988.

Yugusuk was enthroned as Archbishop and Primate on 28 February 1988. Bishop John Baker, of Salisbury, was the representative of the Archbishop of Canterbury, Robert Runcie, at the ceremony. During his tenure, his church experienced an unprecedent growth, which saw the creation of several new dioceses. He retired in February 1998.

He died suddenly in Kosti, on 23 May 2000, and was buried at All Saints Cathedral, in Juba.

Family
Benjamin Yugusuk's son, Paul Pitya Benjamin Yugusuk, followed his father into ordination, and is currently the Archbishop of Central Equatoria, a metropolitan archbishopric within the Episcopal Church of South Sudan.

References

External links
Benjamin Wani Yugusuk at the Dictionary of African Christian Biography

1928 births
2000 deaths
People from Juba
Sudanese Episcopalians
20th-century Anglican bishops in Africa
20th-century Anglican archbishops
Anglican archbishops of South Sudan
Anglican bishops of Rumbek